Korean Veterans association(대한민국 재향군인회) is the organization of military veterans of the Republic of Korea (South Korea). In 2012, they called for a redeployment of military weapons in South Korea to counter deployments in North Korea. The Chairman of Korean Veterans is Park Seh-jik as of 2012.

History
The association was founded in Busan on February 1, 1952, as an institution to assist the South Korean defense ministry, with 30,000 discharged South Korean soldiers as members.

American division
Pastor Hae Soung Kim, Th.D, is the president of Korean Veterans of America, the American chapter of Korean Veterans.

References

Veterans' organizations
Military of South Korea